Jerome Patrick Conway (June 7, 1901 – April 16, 1980) was a Major League Baseball pitcher who played in  with the Washington Senators. He batted and threw left-handed.

He was born and died in Holyoke, Massachusetts.

External links

1901 births
1980 deaths
Major League Baseball pitchers
Baseball players from Massachusetts
Saint Anselm Hawks baseball players
Washington Senators (1901–1960) players